Lavandula buchii is a species of flowering plant in the family Lamiaceae, endemic to Tenerife in the Canary Islands. It was first described by Philip Barker-Webb and Sabin Berthelot, in a part of an 1844–1850 publication that has been dated to 1844.

References

buchii
Endemic flora of the Canary Islands
Plants described in 1844